A Halo for Athuan is a 1986 Australian TV film about two nuns in a rural monastery. It was one of the series of nine Australian telemovies that screened on Friday nights in 1986.

Plot
Mother Paul climbs over the walls of the Athuan monastery and quickly takes over the administration of the monastery's foundering cherry liquor business. She has her sights set on being the next Abbot.

Reception
The Age called it "a real charmer".

References

External links
A Halo for Athuan at ABC

A Halo for Athuan at AustLit
A Haoe for Athuan at Screen Australia

1986 television films
1986 films
Australian television films
Films directed by Alan Burke (director)
1980s English-language films